Haight may refer to:

People with the surname Haight:
 Albert Haight (1842-1926), New York lawyer
 Charles C. Haight (1841-1917), American architect
 Charles S. Haight, Jr., judge in the U.S. District Court for the Southern District of New York 
 David B. Haight (1906–2004), American politician and religious leader
 Elmer E. Haight (1861-1934), American politician
 Gordon S. Haight (1901-1985), American professor of English at Yale University
 Henry Haight (1820-1869), American exchange banker, uncle of Henry Huntly Haight
 Henry Huntly Haight (1825-1878), American politician, Governor of California
 Horton D. Haight (1832–1900), Mormon pioneer
 Jacob Haight, New York State Treasurer 1839-1842
 J. Hayward Haight, American politician
 Roger Haight, is an American Jesuit theologian.
 Thomas Griffith Haight (1879-1942), United States federal judge in New Jersey.

In places:
 Haight, Alberta, a community in Canada
 Haight Street, San Francisco
 Haight-Ashbury, a neighborhood in San Francisco famous for its connections to the 1960s counterculture
 Lower Haight, San Francisco
 Haight Township, Michigan